The 1959 Women's Western Open was contested from August 13–16 at Ranier Golf & Country Club. It was the 30th edition of the Women's Western Open.

This event was won by Betsy Rawls.

Final leaderboard

External links
Spokane Daily Chronicle source

Women's Western Open
Golf in Washington (state)
Women's Western Open
Women's Western Open
Women's Western Open
Women's Western Open
Women's sports in Washington (state)